Autumn Crocus may refer to:

Several species of flowering plant:
 Plants in the genus Crocus which bloom in autumn
 Crocus nudiflorus
 Crocus sativus
 the meadow saffron Colchicum autumnale, which is also known as autumn crocus
 Autumn Crocus (play), a 1931 play by Dodie Smith
 Autumn Crocus (film), a 1934 film adaptation